Minervarya nepalensis (Nepal cricket frog or Nepal warty frog) is a small-sized frog native to northern and northeastern India, Bangladesh, and Nepal. It has recently been reported also from Bhutan. Having distinct and narrow middorsal line (MDL); indistinct skin fringe on outer side of 5th toe; relative finger length (RFL) is 2<1<4<3, 1st finger scarcely longer than 2nd; laterally dark and medially pale throat in males; body tubercles oblong, arranged in longitudinal folds; and snout jutting over jaw.

References

 Rasel, M.M.R., Hannan, M.A. and Howlader, M.S.A. 2007. Four new country records of Fejervarya Bolkay, 1915 (Amphibia: Anura: Dicroglossidae) from Bangladesh. Bonnoprani – Bangladesh Wildlife Bulletin 4(1-2): 1–3.

nepalensis
Amphibians of Bangladesh
Amphibians of Bhutan
Frogs of India
Amphibians of Nepal
Amphibians described in 1975
Taxobox binomials not recognized by IUCN